Gilboa Methodist Church is a historic Methodist church located near Salem, Burke County, North Carolina.  It was built in 1879, and is a rectangular two bay by four bay, frame church building.  It sits on a stone pier foundation and has a standing seam metal roof.

It was listed on the National Register of Historic Places in 1984.

References

Methodist churches in North Carolina
Churches on the National Register of Historic Places in North Carolina
Churches completed in 1879
19th-century Methodist church buildings in the United States
Churches in Burke County, North Carolina
National Register of Historic Places in Burke County, North Carolina